A skorpió I. is a 1918 Hungarian film directed by Michael Curtiz.

External links

1918 films
Films directed by Michael Curtiz
Hungarian silent films
Hungarian black-and-white films